Laurie Latham (born 1955) is a British rock producer who worked with Glenn Tilbrook, Paul Young and others. He has produced albums by Ian Dury & the Blockheads, Echo & the Bunnymen, Squeeze, The Stranglers, The Christians and Slapp Happy.

Career
Latham worked as an engineer during the 1970s on albums by Monty Python and Manfred Mann's Earth Band. He was the producer and engineer for Ian Dury's New Boots and Panties!! and produced the singles "What a Waste" and "Hit Me with Your Rhythm Stick", which went to number one in the UK in 1979.

External links
 SJP Dodgy Music Production Laurie Latham page

References

1955 births
Living people
British record producers